Young Woman and the Sea is an upcoming American biographical drama film written by Jeff Nathanson and directed by Joachim Rønning, and produced by Walt Disney Pictures and Jerry Bruckheimer Films. The film stars Daisy Ridley and centers on Gertrude Ederle, who was an American competitive swimmer and Olympic champion.

Young Woman and the Sea will be released on Disney+.

Premise 
Young Woman and the Sea tells the story of Gertrude Ederle, an American swimming champion, who first won a gold medal at the 1924 Olympic Games. In 1926, Ederle became the first woman to swim 21 miles across the English Channel.

Cast 
 Daisy Ridley as Gertrude Ederle: An American competition swimmer and Olympic champion.
 Tilda Cobham-Hervey as Margaret Ederle: Gertrude's sister.
 Anton Poryazov as English Channel Swimmer
 Quinn Patrick as Carnival Barker

Additionally, Stephen Graham and Christopher Eccleston have been cast in undisclosed roles.

Production 
On November 2, 2015, it was announced that Jerry Bruckheimer acquired the rights to Glenn Stout's non-fiction book Young Woman and the Sea: How Trudy Ederle Conquered the English Channel and Inspired the World for Paramount Pictures, hiring Jeff Nathanson to write the script for the film, and Lily James cast to play Gertrude Ederle. In December 2020, it was reported that the film was in development at Disney, with the company eyeing a Disney+ release, after Paramount put it in turnaround. Production will be overseen by Jerry Bruckheimer and Chad Oman for Disney.

Lily James was originally cast to play the lead role of Gertrude Ederle, until the film lay in development hell. With the film's announcement in December 2020, Daisy Ridley was cast in the lead role instead. In March 2022, Tilda Cobham-Hervey joined the cast of the film playing Margaret Ederle, along with Stephen Graham in an undisclosed role. In May 2022, Christopher Eccleston joined the cast in an undisclosed role.

Filming 
Principal photography began by early May 2022, and wrapped on June 18, 2022.

Release 
Young Woman and the Sea is scheduled to debut on Disney+. Bruckheimer said that the film may be released in theaters

References

External links
 

 

American drama films
Films set in 1924
Films set in 1926
Walt Disney Pictures films
Films directed by Joachim Rønning
Films produced by Jerry Bruckheimer
Disney+ original films
Upcoming English-language films
American films based on actual events
Biographical films about sportspeople
Films about the 1924 Summer Olympics
Films about Olympic swimming and diving
Sports films based on actual events
Swimming films
Films shot in Bulgaria
Films set in Paris
Films set in New York (state)